Why Would I Lie? is a 1980 American comedy-drama film about a compulsive liar named Cletus (Treat Williams).  The film, which was directed by Larry Peerce and shot in Spokane, Washington, is based on the novel The Fabricator by Hollis Hodges.

Plot
Cletus Hayworth, a compulsive liar, is employed as a social worker. He tries to find a home for a young boy named Jorge and, in so doing, falls in love with a social worker, who unbeknownst to everyone is Jorge's mother.

Cast

 Treat Williams as Cletus Hayworth
 Lisa Eichhorn as Kay Lindsey
 Gabriel Macht as Jorge
 Susan Heldfond as Amy Grower
 Anne Byrne as Faith Hayworth
 Valerie Curtin as Mrs. Bok
 Jocelyn Brando as Mrs. Crumpe
 Nicolas Coster as Walter Hayworth
 Severn Darden as Dr. Ed Barbour
 Sonny Davis as Paul Hayworth
 Jane Burkett as Natalie
 Kay Cummings as Edith
 Mia Bendixsen as Thelma
 Ilene Kristen as Waitress
 Harriett Gibson as Mary Kalinsky
 Cynthia Hoppenfeld as Opel McCarthy
 Mitzi Hoag as Mrs. Hayworth
 Natalie Core as Mrs. Gogle
 Shirley Slater as Warden
 Jan D'Arcy as Card Player
 Marian Gants as Card Player

Reception
Janet Maslin of The New York Times was not impressed: "It takes about three-quarters of an hour to figure out where Why Would I Lie? is going, and by that time it's clear the movie won't get there. ...First seen on his psychiatrist's couch, where he sports an antique coal miner's helmet, Cletus appears to be a cute, troubled guy in the Morgan! mold. It never becomes clear quite what he is, though. And before the audience even has time to get used to him, he has become involved in a convoluted plot that probably worked better on the page than it does on the screen. ...As directed by Larry Peerce, Why Would I Lie? isn't often funny, especially since Cletus's tall tales generally have a macabre ring. ...Mr. Williams can be charming, but he has none of the whimsical nature that might make Cletus's exploits believable."

Awards
Nominee Best Comedy Picture - Young Artist Award
Nominee Best Young Actor - Young Artist Award (Gabriel Macht)

References

External links

 

1980 films
1980 comedy-drama films
Films directed by Larry Peerce
Films scored by Charles Fox
American comedy-drama films
Metro-Goldwyn-Mayer films
1980 comedy films
1980 drama films
1980s English-language films
1980s American films